"Friends" is a song by Norwegian singer Stella Getz. Produced by Lars E. Ludvigsen and Mikkel S. Eriksen, it was released in November 1993 as the first single from her debut album, Forbidden Dreams (1994). It was a number-one hit in Hungary and Israel, and a top 10 hit in Scandinavia, peaking at number five in Norway and number nine in Denmark.

Background and release
Getz was discovered after entering a DMC contest at the age of 16. After having cut just a few demos, she soon got herself a deal with Mega Records and went into studio with producers Lars E. Ludvigsen and Mikkel S. Eriksen to work on her first single, "Friends". It has been described as a fusion of loud but subtle rock guitars with a techno foundation, highlighted by a remarkable melody and Getz' fog horn-strength vocals. She made her first public appearance on Norwegian Television performing the song in the popular TV-show Casino.

"Friends" was successful on the charts in several countries, including peaking at number-one in both Hungary and Israel. It also reached the top 5 in Norway, and the top 10 in Denmark. In Germany, it peaked at number 32, with a total of 16 weeks on the charts. The single also peaked at number 81 on the Eurochart Hot 100 in February 1994.

Critical reception
Pan-European magazine Music & Media wrote, "The instant appeal of the single is clear, and so is the 17-year old singer with African blood in her veins. A stunning synth riff like on Stevie Wonder's Superstitious are the wheels on which this song rides. Miss Getz raps and scats—what else with such a jazzy surname?—on top of that. The sing-along chorus is the finishing touch of the song, easily holding its own in the Euro dance field which is suffering already too much from conventions, making it almost impossible to say who's who. With the Winter Olympics in Lillehammer ahead, one gold medal should go to Norway at least. For originality."

Music video
A music video directed by Swedish-based director Matt Broadley was produced by Mega Records to promote the single. It shows the singer in a big yellow-painted room. Through a telescope she sees a crowd of "friends" arriving and then starts singing. The "friends" are coming through the door, although Getz tries to keep them outside. Wearing white masks, they're taking over the place, breaking LP-records, dancing on them and eating all the food in the fridge. They are also tagging down the walls with graffiti spray, and in the end, the "friends" are dancing around Getz, who has been tied with a rope to a tall lamp. The video was A-listed on Germany's VIVA in March 1994 and was later published on Mega Records's official YouTube channel in December 2011. As of December 2022, it had generated more than 485,000 views.

Track listing
 CD maxi
"Friends" (7") – 3:12
"Friends" (12") – 7:14
"Friends" (Late Nite Mix) – 4:38
"Friends" (U.S. Remix) – 2:55

 CD maxi (Remix)
"Friends" (MEGA-Dance Remix) – 5:34
"Friends" (Cyber-Town Remix) – 5:06
"Friends" (Tango Remix) – 2:52
"Friends" (Hi-Rate Remix) – 6:18

Charts

External links
Stella Getz - Friends (Tango Remix - Scratchy Version) (Music video)
Stella Getz - Behind the Scenes (Forbidden Dreams EPK) [Part 1 of 2] 
Stella Getz - Behind the Scenes (Forbidden Dreams EPK) [Part 2 of 2]

References

 

1993 debut singles
1993 singles
1993 songs
English-language Norwegian songs
Mega Records singles
Music videos directed by Matt Broadley
Number-one singles in Hungary
Number-one singles in Israel
Songs about friendship
Songs written by Mikkel Storleer Eriksen
Stella Getz songs